Héctor Walter Baldassi (born 5 January 1966) is an Argentine retired football referee and politician. His first Argentine first division was in 1998 and only two years later he debuted internationally. Nicknamed La Coneja (Spanish for "the she-rabbit"), Baldassi officiated several CONMEBOL club competitions including the final match of the 2008 Copa Libertadores, and participated in several international competitions including the 2004 Copa América and the 2008 Olympic Games in Beijing. He was called for the 2007 FIFA U-20 World Cup but was later dismissed because one of his assistants didn't pass the medical tests.

Despite his errors against Brazilian soccer teams in 2008 Libertadores da América, he was preselected as a referee for the 2010 FIFA World Cup, officiating his first World Cup match in Ghana's 1–0 win over Serbia on 13 June 2010. Then, he officiated Netherlands 1-0 win over Japan.

In 2013, he was elected to be a member of the Argentine Chamber of Deputies, representing his home province of Córdoba for the Republican Proposal (PRO) party. He was re-elected in 2017.

References

1966 births
Living people
Argentine football referees
Argentine sportsperson-politicians
Republican Proposal politicians
People from Córdoba Province, Argentina
Copa América referees
FIFA World Cup referees
2010 FIFA World Cup referees
Members of the Argentine Chamber of Deputies elected in Córdoba